Nantai may refer to:

 , stratovolcano in Tochigi Prefecture, Kantō, Honshu, Japan
 Nantai Island, island on the Min River in Cangshan District, Fuzhou, Fujian, China
 Nantai Temple, Buddhist temple on Mount Heng, in Hengyang, Hunan, China
 Nantai, Liaoning, town in and subdivision of Haicheng, Liaoning, China